The Blondes 'Ave More Fun Tour was a worldwide concert tour held by British singer-songwriter Rod Stewart to promote his album Blondes Have More Fun. The tour began on 20 November 1978 in Paris and ended on 28 June 1979 in Los Angeles, California.

Tour dates

Set list 
 Hot Legs
 Born Loose
 Tonight's The Night (Gonna Be Alright)
 The Wild Side of Life
 Get Back 
 You're In My Heart (The Final Acclaim)
 I Don't Want to Talk About It
 (If Loving You Is Wrong) I Don't Want to Be Right 
 Blondes (Have More Fun)
 Da Ya Think I'm Sexy?
 I Just Want to Make Love to You 
 The Killing of Georgie (Parts I & II)
 Maggie May
 (I Know) I'm Losing You 
 Sweet Little Rock And Roller 
 Sailing 

Encore
 Twistin' the Night Away 
 You Wear It Well

Personnel 
 Rod Stewart – vocals
 Gary Grainger – guitars
 Billy Peek – guitars and vocals
 Jim Cregan – guitars and vocals
 Phil Chen – bass and vocals
 Carmine Appice – drums
 Kevin Savigar – keyboards
 Phil Kenzie – horns

References 

1978 concert tours
1979 concert tours
Rod Stewart concert tours